Randegan Station (RDN) is a small railway station located in  Karangasem, Sampang, Cilacap Regency, Central Java, Indonesia.

The station sits at an elevation of +11 m (36 ft) amsl. The station is under the subdivision DAOP V Purwokerto of PT Kereta Api Indonesia (Persero). The station is not far from Indonesian National Route 3 which leads to Bandung and Yogyakarta.

History 
The station was built in 1915 by the Dutch East Indies Railway Bureau (Staatsspoorwegen West Lijnen, SS-WL).

The station initially had 2 tracks with second being a passing track, but with the opening of the Double track Prupuk–Kroya railway on 28 January 2019, the station now has 2 Passing track and 2 side tracks. The original building is still standing and maintained to this day.

Services 
As of 2020, there are no trains that stop in Randegan Station.

References

External links 
 

Cilacap Regency
Railway stations in Central Java
Railway stations opened in 1916